
The Rishi order is a religious tradition, concept for the mystical teaching or spiritual practices associated with religious harmony of Sufism in the Kashmir Valley. The sufi saint of Rishi order influenced Kashmiris and its culture. The prominent Rishis of the valley include Resh Mir Sàeb and Nund Rishi, also known as Sheikh Noor-ud-din Wali. The Rishi order has made an important contribution to Kashmiriyat, the ethnic, national, social and cultural consciousness of the Kashmiri people, as well as a distinctive contribution to global Islam.

The 17th-century poet Baba Nasib sums up the impact of the Rishi order thus: "The candle of religion is lit by the Rishis, they are the pioneers of the path of belief. The heart-warming quality of humble souls emanates from the inner purity of the hearts of the Rishis. This vale of Kashmir, that you call a paradise, owes a lot of its charm to the traditions set in vogue by the Rishis."

Overview 

The original Rishi Sufis were focused on seclusion and emphasis on meditation. They were the ascetics involving in the abstinence from worldy pleasure. In his memoirs, Jahangir says that "they possess simplicity and are without pretence. They abuse no one. They restrain the tongue of desire and the foot of seeking. They eat no flesh, they have no wives and always plant fruit bearing trees in the fields so that men may benefit by them, themselves desiring no advantage. There are about 2,000 of these people."

In recent years, the history of the Rishi order has attracted interest from scholars such as Mohammad Ishaq Khan.

Relationship with Hinduism 

Hindus seek to understand themselves and love God which is the same end goal of Sufism. Nund Rishi and Lal Ded, both sufi and shaivite saints criticised idol worshipping, orthodox religious practices, eating meat, they insisted that all religions are equal and believed God was one. Kashmiris use the traditional Indian epithets Rishi or Baba to describe these saints. The Shaivite yogini Lal Ded was a key influence on Nund Rishi, and is said to have suckled him at her breast when he was an infant. Sufi Rishis were certainly aware of yogic practices, as evidenced by the poet Shams Faqir's praise of Lal Ded: "Lalla achieved the fusion of her vital air and ether, and thus realized God."

References 

FURTHER READING:

 "The Rise, Growth and Decline of Indo-Persian Literature" by R. M. Chopra, 2012, Iran Culture House, New Delhi and Iran Society, Kolkata. 2nd Edition 2013.

Sufism
Sufi orders